Amphiderita is a genus of snout moths described by Alfred Jefferis Turner in 1925. Its single species, Amphiderita pyrospila, was named by the same author in the same year. It is found in Australia.

References

Pyralini
Moths described in 1925
Monotypic moth genera
Moths of Australia
Pyralidae genera